Tadevuš Kandrusievič (born 3 January 1946) is a Belarusian prelate of the Catholic Church who served as Archbishop of Minsk–Mohilev from 2007 to 2021. He has been a bishop since 1989, and from 1991 to 2007 held posts in Russia.

Early life and education
Tadevuš Kandrusievič was born in Odelsk, Grodno District, Belarus, on 3 January 1946 to an ethnic Polish family, the elder of the two children of Ignacy Kondrusiewicz (1906–1985) and his wife Anna (née Szusta; 1911–1999). His sister was Maria Kondrusiewicz Buro (1949–1997). In 1962, after completing his secondary schooling, he studied at the Department of Physics and Mathematics at the Grodno Pedagogical Institute, a teachers' training college. He had to leave a year later because of his practice of Catholicism.

In 1964, he entered the Department of Energetics and Machinery Construction at the Leningrad Polytechnical Institute (now the Saint Petersburg Polytechnical University). He graduated in 1970, becoming a mechanical engineer. He worked in Vilnius, Lithuania, which was then part of the Soviet Union.

Early career
In 1976, aged 30, he entered Kaunas Priest Seminary and he was ordained a priest on 31 May 1981. He served as assistant curate in a number of parishes in Lithuania. On 13 February 1988, he was appointed parish priest of the parishes of Our Lady of Angels and St. Francis Xavier in Grodno, Belarus.

On 10 May 1989, Pope John Paul II appointed him Apostolic Administrator of Minsk, Belarus and Titular Bishop of Hippo Diarrhytus. On 20 October, he was consecrated bishop by John Paul at St. Peter's Basilica, with Cardinals Edward Idris Cassidy and Francesco Colasuonno as co-consecrators.

During his service as a bishop he founded the Senior Grodno Seminary, managed to return and reopening of about 100 churches in Belarus. He initiated the translation and publication of Catholic religious literature in the Belarusian language.

On 13 April 1991, an Apostolic Administration was erected for Russia Europea (European part of Russia) based in Moscow, and Kandrusievič was appointed to head it. In 1999, this Apostolic Administration was divided in two and he remained head of the northern one, Russia Europea Settentrionale. Finally, on 11 February 2002, the pope elevated his Apostolic Administrations and the others in Russia to dioceses united in an ecclesiastical province. The Apostolic Administration in Moscow became the Metropolitan Archdiocese of Moscow, and Kondrusiewicz was named Archbishop.

Between 1999 and 2005, Kandrusievič spent two three-year terms as chairman of the Conference of Catholic Bishops of Russia. From 1994 to 1999, he was a member of the Congregation for the Oriental Churches, and since 1996 of the Pontifical Council for Health Pastoral Care.

Kandrusievič is seen by many as a moderate conservative, being hostile towards the traditionalist movement and the restoration of the Tridentine Mass, but at the same time disallowing or discouraging many of the excesses of theological and liturgical liberalism in his diocese. He has been instrumental in the reestablishment of the Roman Catholic Church in Russia after the collapse of the Communist regime.

Archbishop of Minsk
On 21 September 2007, Kandrusievič was appointed Metropolitan Archbishop of Minsk-Mahilyow by Pope Benedict XVI.

On 30 June 2011, Kazimierz Świątek retired from his position as Apostolic Administrator of Pinsk, and Kandrusievič replaced him.

During mass on 1 November 2017, Kandrusievič called the 1917 October Revolution in Russia an "existential disaster" that brought immense suffering to Belarus. He noted that Belarus still celebrates the revolution date as a public holiday, while the Catholic population do not have official day-offs on All Saints Day and Memorial Day to perform their rites.

On 31 August 2020, Kandrusievič was prevented from entering Belarus after visiting Poland, despite being a Belarusian citizen. Kondrusiewicz had told an interviewer that "There is reason to believe that the [9 August 2020] election was dishonest". On 19 August he prayed at a prison that held people arrested for protesting that election and on 21 August he met with the Interior Minister to lodge a protest against the government's response to the protests. He was finally allowed to return on 24 December.

Upon turning 75 on 3 January 2021, Kandrusievič tendered his resignation and Pope Francis accepted it immediately.

Awards
He was awarded the Medal "In Commemoration of the 300th Anniversary of Saint Petersburg".

In March 2021, the Center for Belarusian Solidarity awarded Kondrusiewicz the Global Belarusian Solidarity Award in the category "With Faith in My Heart".

References

External links

 

1946 births
Living people
People from Hrodna District
Catholic Church in Russia
21st-century Roman Catholic archbishops in Belarus
Belarusian people of Polish descent
Belarusian anti-communists
Belarusian dissidents
Soviet people of Polish descent
Peter the Great St. Petersburg Polytechnic University alumni
Belarusian Roman Catholic archbishops